H.E. Dr Habib Abou-Sakr is a Lebanese Maronite academic who served as secretary general of finance under various Lebanese governments as well as vice-chancellor of the Catholic University of St Paul La Sagesse.

External links
Embassy of Lebanon, Washington D.C.

Year of birth missing (living people)
People from Aley District
Living people
Government ministers of Lebanon
Place of birth missing (living people)
Lebanese Maronites